Littlemoss High School for Boys was a comprehensive school in Littlemoss, Droylsden, Tameside, England. It merged with Droylsden High School, Mathematics and Computing College for Girls in September 2009 to become Droylsden Academy.

Prior to the merger it educated about 550 boys and held specialist Business and Enterprise College status.

Academic standards
The school was under special measures from March 1998 until July 2002.

After their March 2004 inspection Ofsted reported that "This is a good, effective school that has been very successful in improving the areas of weakness identified in the previous report. Very good leadership, together with the significant improvements in teaching and learning and in pupils’ behaviour, has improved standards overall, although standards are still below average." They rated the school Good, point three on a seven-point scale.

Awards and mentions
 Schools Achievement Award and Sportsmark in 2002.
 Mentioned in Parliament as a member of the Peacemaker Consultation Programme.

Notable teachers
Sarah Joynes was awarded a distinction in the North West Guardian Award for Teacher of the Year in a Secondary School in 2007.

Woodwork teacher Harry "Bulldog" Johnson achieved national fame in 1979 when he won the jackpot on Littlewoods Pools, receiving a prize of over £750,000. He planned to retire at the end of the school term but died of a heart attack just a few weeks after his win.

In July 2008, Science teacher Chris Hilton disappeared on holiday in the French Alps. His body was discovered 7 months later in February 2009.

Former German & French teacher Geoff Rees is now part of the rock group the Badgers

Notable alumni
 Howard Donald of Take That attended Littlemoss High School between 1979 and 1984.
 Carl Murphy who received a Royal Humane Society Testimonial in December 2004 for saving a man's life at sea.
Dale Cregan the One eyed Manchester Cop Killer attended in the 90's

Notes

The photograph showing of the school prior to demolition is not Littlemoss School.
The photograph is of Manor Road Girls School.
Please update as this misinformation is now being shared on social media post in error.

References

External links
 Official site

Defunct schools in Tameside
2009 disestablishments in England
Educational institutions disestablished in 2009
Droylsden